Wigdale Lake is a natural lake in South Dakota, in the United States.

Wigdale Lake has the name of Ole G. Wigdale, an early settler.

See also
List of lakes in South Dakota

References

Lakes of South Dakota
Lakes of Deuel County, South Dakota